The Military Government of Poland, also known as the Military Government of Lublin, was a
military administration of an area of the Russian Empire under the occupation of the Austria-Hungary, during the World War I, that existed from 1915 to 1917. It was administered under the command of Governors-General, with the seat of government originally based in Kielce, and in October 1915, moved to Lublin.

History 

On August 25, 1915, the Imperial and Royal Army formed the General Government of Kielce, which was called the General Government of Lublin from October 1, 1915. It covered the southern parts of Russian Poland. On October 10, 1916, the German Chancellor Theobald von Bethmann Hollweg demanded the eviction of the Austrian General Government of Lublin and the creation of a joint administration with the German General Government of Warsaw. However, this was done by the Austrian-Hungarian Foreign Minister Stephan Burián von Rajecz, who declined. On October 18, 1916, an agreement was reached on the uniform legislation and administration of the General Governorates of Warsaw and Lublin. As a result of the proclamation of the Kingdom of Poland on November 5, 1916, the gradual transfer of administration to Poland was planned. Due to different ideas from the German and Austrian-Hungarian side regarding the future role of Poland and Polish independence efforts, the establishment of Polish state organs has stalled several times. It was only in the summer of 1917 that the first parts of the judiciary and the teaching system were released from the direct management of the occupation administration. Interventions by the Governor-General continued to take place.

Governors-General

See also 
 Imperial German General Government of Belgium
 Government General of Warsaw

Notes

Literature 
 Gerhard Hirschfeld / Gerd Krumeich / Irina Renz (ed.): Encyclopedia First World War, keyword: "Generalgouvernement", Paderborn 2004, p. 524 f.
 Stephan Lehnstaedt: The Military General Government of Lublin. The "utilization" of Poland by Austria-Hungary in the First World War; Journal of East Central Europe Research, 2012, digitized (PDF; 0.6 MB)

Eastern Front (World War I)
1915 establishments in Austria-Hungary
1918 disestablishments in Austria-Hungary
States and territories established in 1915
States and territories disestablished in 1918
Poland in World War I
Military occupations of Poland
History of Lublin